Suzanne Marie Ernrup, born 30 November 1954 in Stockholm) is a Swedish actress. She studied at Gothenburg Theatre Academy 1978–81. She is married to the actor Anders Sundquist and they have a daughter called Hedvig.

Selected filmography
1981 – Tuppen
1984 – Åke and His World
1985 – Lösa förbindelser (TV)
1987 – Hip hip hurra!
1987 – Varuhuset (TV)
1989 – Hassel – Offren
1992 – Jönssonligan och den svarta diamanten
1992 – Sunday's Children
1992 – Rederiet (TV)
1994–95 – Du bestämmer (TV)
1995 – Snoken (TV)
1997 – Pelle Svanslös (TV ("Julkalendern"))
1997 – Skilda världar (TV)
2001 – Pusselbitar (TV)
2002 – Bella – bland kryddor och kriminella (TV)
2007 – En riktig jul (TV ("Julkalendern"))
2008 – LasseMajas detektivbyrå – Kameleontens hämnd
2013 – - Fröken Frimans krig

References

External links

Swedish film actresses
Swedish television actresses
1954 births
Living people
Actresses from Stockholm